Willis & Co. is a piano manufacturer, formerly founded in 1884  by Alexander Parker Willis and based in Landshut, Bavaria, Germany. A retailer of Willis & Co. in Canada was sold by the Willis family in 1967, and went out of business in 1979. The global branch was merged with the Landshut Willis company in Germany.

History 
In 1884, a retailer of Willis & Co. was established in Quebec, Montreal by Alexander Parker Willis.

In 1900, Willis & Co. acquired the major shares of the Lesage & Fils piano factory.

In 1907, Willis & Co. purchased controlling interest in the Lesage Piano Company and the firm started producing “Willis & Company” brand pianos full time.

In 1910, at its peak, Willis & Co. made close to 3000 pianos each year.

In 1967, the Canadian retailer was vended by the Willis family, and the global branch was merged with the Landshut Willis company in Germany.

On August 30, 1976, brand Willis (registered number:DE948592) was approved by German Patent and Trade Mark Office.

Willis' latest trademark update time took place on June 29, 2016, whose current registered number is DE302016214832.

References

External links
 Canadian Encyclopedia
  Pianotech.ca

German companies established in 1884
Piano manufacturing companies of Germany
Companies based in Bavaria
Musical instrument manufacturing companies of Canada
Manufacturing companies established in 1884
Landshut